Ștefan Golescu (1809 – 1874) was a Wallachian Romanian politician who served as the Minister of Foreign Affairs for two terms from 1 March 1867 to 5 August 1867 and from 13 November 1867 to 30 April 1868, and as Prime Minister of Romania between 26 November 1867 and 12 May 1868.

Biography
Ștefan Golescu was the son of the great patriot scholar Dinicu Golescu.
Born in a boyar family of the Golești, he studied with his brothers (Nicolae and Radu) in Switzerland. After he returned, he joined the Wallachian Army and became a major in 1836. With his brother he also joined the Philharmonic Society, a society similar to the Freemasonry.

Ștefan was involved in the triggering of the 1848 Wallachian revolution, participating in the Islaz gathering of 9 June 1848, when he became a member of the Provisional Government, serving as Minister of Justice.

During the writing of the new constitution, Ștefan Golescu supported Nicolae Bălcescu's idea of universal suffrage, while his brother, Nicolae, favoured less expansive participation. Ștefan was part of the delegation sent by the revolutionaries to Istanbul to negotiate the new constitution with the Ottoman Empire, Wallachia's overlord.

Ștefan Golescu was a member of the Wallachian assembly that elected Alexandru Ioan Cuza as prince of both Wallachia and Moldavia (1859). Afterwards, he was a member of the Liberal Party of Ion Brătianu and served for about half a year as Prime Minister of Romania in a Liberal government.

Gallery

References

 

1809 births
1874 deaths
People of the Revolutions of 1848
People from Câmpulung
Prime Ministers of Romania
Prime Ministers of the Principality of Wallachia
Romanian Ministers of Foreign Affairs
Romanian Ministers of Interior
Members of the Chamber of Deputies (Romania)
Members of the Senate of Romania
Presidents of the Senate of Romania
Romanian revolutionaries
Stefan